Hotel Delaware is a historic hotel building located at East Branch in Delaware County, New York, United States. It was built in 1891 and enlarged after a fire in 1908.  It is a large three-story wood-framed building, 40 feet wide and 70 feet deep.  It features a two-story verandah on the front facade supported by Doric order columns on the first story.

It was listed on the National Register of Historic Places in 2004.

See also
National Register of Historical Places listings in Delaware County, New York

References

National Register of Historic Places in Delaware County, New York
Hotels in New York (state)
Hotel buildings completed in 1891
Buildings and structures in Delaware County, New York